The Queens Plaza station is an express station on the IND Queens Boulevard Line of the New York City Subway. Located under the eastern edge of Queens Plaza at the large Queens Plaza interchange, it is served by the E train at all times, by the R train at all times except late nights, and by the M train on weekdays except late nights.

While situated relatively close to the elevated Queensboro Plaza station on the BMT Astoria Line and IRT Flushing Line, there is no free transfer between the two stations.

History

The Queens Boulevard Line was one of the first lines built by the city-owned Independent Subway System (IND), and stretches between the IND Eighth Avenue Line in Manhattan and 179th Street and Hillside Avenue in Jamaica, Queens. The Queens Boulevard Line was in part financed by a Public Works Administration (PWA) loan and grant of $25 million. One of the proposed stations would have been located at Steinway Street.

The first section of the line, west from Roosevelt Avenue to 50th Street, opened on August 19, 1933. E trains ran local to Hudson Terminal (today's World Trade Center) in Manhattan, while the GG (predecessor to current G service) ran as a shuttle service between Queens Plaza and Nassau Avenue on the IND Crosstown Line. It was the first stop in Queens after crossing the East River for six years until the 1939 opening of 23rd Street–Ely Avenue.

Until the opening of the 60th Street Tunnel Connection in 1955 after the unification of the subway, only express trains in Queens ran to Manhattan; local trains were routed onto the IND Crosstown Line. This service pattern is no longer in use due to the opening of the 63rd Street track connector in 2001, and Crosstown Line trains now terminate one stop earlier at Court Square.

In 1978, the New York City Department of City Planning proposed making Queens Plaza into a large subway station complex. Queens Plaza would have been converted to a transfer station with the 63rd Street Line, which at that time was described as a "tunnel to nowhere" that did not connect with any other lines in Queens. The complex would also have had a retail center above it, as well as a transfer to the elevated Queensboro Plaza station. This was ultimately not constructed, and the 63rd Street connector was built instead, between the Queens Plaza and 36th Street stations.

In 2002, the Metropolitan Transportation Authority announced that elevators would be installed at the Queens Plaza station.

Station layout

Like most express stations in the subway, Queens Plaza has two island platforms and four tracks to facilitate cross-platform interchanges between local and express trains. Its tile band is of the darkest shade of the violet family (Black Grape), three tiles high and black-bordered.

West of the station, the M train (and the E train during late nights) crosses to the express track from the local track. R trains stay on the local tracks, which split to the BMT Broadway Line via the 60th Street Tunnel to Manhattan and IND Crosstown Line to Brooklyn. The connection to the Crosstown Line is not currently used in revenue service, while the 60th Street Tunnel Connection is used by the R. The express tracks, used by E and M trains, continue to Court Square–23rd Street at Long Island City before they travel through the 53rd Street Tunnel to Manhattan.

East of the station, the M train (and the E train during late nights) crosses from the express track to the local track, after which the tunnel widens to include a lay-up track that forms from the two express tracks and then merges with the northbound express track. This track is used to relay the New York Transit Museum's holiday trains in November and December. The tunnel then widens again to allow the IND 63rd Street Line ramps to rise and lead trains to merge with either the local or express tracks.

Both trackside walls have a deep plum trim line with a black border and tile captions reading "QUEENS PLAZA" in white Helvetica on black. These replace the original trim line, which was a bit brighter (the same color as the next five local stations east), and the tile captions in the original IND font. Slate purple I-beam columns run along both platforms at regular intervals, alternating ones having the standard black station name plate with white lettering.

Exits

The full-time booth is near the center of the mezzanine. There are three staircases to the street on all corners of Queens Boulevard and Jackson Avenue except the northern one. There is an outside passageway to two more staircases near the southern and western corners of Jackson Avenue and Orchard Street at the south end near a former booth. The old-style change booth was in place until it was removed in 1998. Two of the outside entrances were redone to match the facade of the DOT indoor parking lot structure when it was constructed in 1975.

Before the renovation, the station had a full length mezzanine (inside and outside of fare control) with three booths. Since then, this area has balconies that allow views of local trains and platforms down below. There are three staircases to each platform from that end. Two staircases in between both fare control areas were removed during the renovation process.  The space in between the two fare control areas was needed to build a signal relay room for the 63rd Street Connection. The part-time booth has two stairs to the northwest and southeast corners of Northern Boulevard at 41st Avenue, and one to each platform.

References

External links 

 
 Station Reporter — E Train
 Station Reporter — R Train
 Station Reporter — M Train
 The Subway Nut — Queens Plaza Pictures
 MTA's Arts For Transit — Queens Plaza (IND Queens Boulevard Line)
 Queens Plaza entrance from Google Maps Street View
 41st Avenue entrance from Google Maps Street View
 Entrance south of Queens Plaza from Google Maps Street View
 Platforms from Google Maps Street View

IND Queens Boulevard Line stations
1933 establishments in New York City
New York City Subway stations in Queens, New York
Railway stations in the United States opened in 1933
Long Island City